François Laloux (born 1890, date of death unknown) was a Belgian tennis player. He competed in the men's doubles event at the 1920 Summer Olympics.

References

External links
 

1890 births
Year of death missing
Belgian male tennis players
Olympic tennis players of Belgium
Tennis players at the 1920 Summer Olympics
Place of birth missing